HSBC Centre is an office building of HSBC in Tai Kok Tsui, Kowloon, Hong Kong. It consists of a 14-storey and two twin connected 15-storey office towers resting on a 1-level podium with a public transport interchange and a 2-level basement carpark were built.

Formerly Tai Kok Tsui Ferry Pier Bus Terminus, the building was developed by Sino Land in 1998 during the development of Olympian City. Later, Sino sold the office part of the building to HSBC at HK$4 billion. Then HSBC's back office started there in 1999.

Floor Directory
Ground Floor (G/F): 
MTR Olympic station public transport interchange;
MTR Olympic station Exit B and C;
Building Lobby and main entrance.
Upper Ground Floor (UG/F):
Office Lobbies of Tower 1, 2 & 3;
The Hongkong and Shanghai Banking Corporation HSBC Centre Branch
HSBC Express Banking Centre
Staff Canteen
Staff Only Pacific Coffee
Staff Medical Clinic
Wayfoong Sports Club (WSC) fitness centre
Wayfoong Nursery School
Footbridges to MTR Olympic station and Harbour Green
2/F to 18/F: Various Supporting Departments Offices of The Hongkong and Shanghai Banking Corporation

Lion statues

For the celebration of the 150th anniversary of HSBC, a pair of lions were re-cast in 2015, modelling on the Hong Kong lions at the HSBC Main Building. They are placed at the lobby of HSBC Centre.

References

Olympian City
HSBC buildings and structures
Sino Group
Office buildings completed in 1998
Twin towers